Joel Thomas Pilkington (born 1 August 1984) is a former English footballer who played as a midfielder. He made four substitute appearances in the Football League whilst playing for Burnley.

References

Hyde United stats
Mossley stats 

1984 births
Living people
People from Accrington
English footballers
Association football midfielders
Burnley F.C. players
Hyde United F.C. players
Mossley A.F.C. players
Chorley F.C. players
Clitheroe F.C. players
Ramsbottom United F.C. players
Runcorn Linnets F.C. players
English Football League players